Colonel Francis Joseph Caldwell Wyatt (10 July 1882 – 5 May 1971) was an English cricketer. Wyatt was a right-handed batsman who bowled right-arm medium pace. Wyatt was educated at Dulwich College and Glenalmond College.

Wyatt made his first-class debut for the Gentlemen of England against Oxford University in 1904.

In 1905 Wyatt made his debut for Hampshire in 1905 against the touring Australians. Wyatt played 11 first-class matches for Hampshire from 1905 to 1906, in 1908 and after the First World War in 1919, with his final match for the county coming against Yorkshire. In his 11 matches for the county he took 44 wickets at a bowling average of 21.25, with four five wicket hauls and best figures of 6/31 against Somerset in 1908. In the field Wyatt took a total of 11 catches for the county.

For the 1906–07 South African cricket season Wyatt represented Orange Free State, making his debut against Western Province. Wyatt played 4 first-class matches for the state, all in the 1906–07 season, with his final first-class match for the state coming against Eastern Province. In his 4 matches for the state he took 19 wickets at an average of 17.47, with one five wicket haul of 5/18 against Western Province.

In 1912 Wyatt made his debut for the Army against the Royal Navy. He played two further matches for the Army before the war and one after in 1919 against Oxford University. In his four first-class matches Wyatt took 22 wickets at an average of 16.45, with one five wicket haul of 6/56 against the Royal Navy in 1912.

As well as playing first-class cricket for the above-mentioned teams, Wyatt also played a single first-class match for the Gentlemen of the South in 1905. Additionally, in 1929 he played two non first-class matches for Hong Kong against Shanghai and Malaya.

Wyatt died at Chichester, Sussex on 5 May 1971.

Family
Wyatt's brother-in-law Archibald Douglas played first-class cricket for Surrey, the Europeans (India) and Middlesex.

External links
Francis Wyatt at Cricinfo
Francis Wyatt at CricketArchive
Matches and detailed statistics for Francis Wyatt

1882 births
1971 deaths
Sportspeople from Tiruchirappalli
People educated at Dulwich College
People educated at Glenalmond College
English cricketers
Hampshire cricketers
Free State cricketers
British Army cricketers
British Army personnel of World War I
Royal Engineers officers
Gentlemen of the South cricketers
Gentlemen of England cricketers
Cricketers from Tamil Nadu
Military personnel of British India
British people in colonial India